The French submarine Dupuy de Lôme was the lead boat of the class of submarines built for the French Navy.

Dupuy de Lôme, named after the French naval architect Henri Dupuy de Lôme, was laid down in Toulon in 1913, launched on 9 September 1915 and commissioned in July 1916. She was decommissioned on 24 February 1935, and sold for scrap in Brest on 6 August 1938.

See also 
List of submarines of France

Notes

Bibliography

External links
Castel, Marc: Dupuy de Lôme at Sous-marins Français 1863 - pagesperso-orange.fr (French)

Dupuy de Lôme-class submarines
Ships built in France
1915 ships